AIGCP (Association International des Groupes Cyclistes Professionels) is an association that groups together many professional cycling teams.

Based in Lannion, France, its managing director is Luuc Eisenga, and the president is  manager Iwan Spekenbrink, who was elected in 2015.

Cycling organizations in France
Cycle racing organizations